Back in Beige – The Return of Alleinunterhalter vol. II is the second album by German covers artist Mambo Kurt. This time he featured more obscure mixture of songs, such as Danzig, Status Quo and Britney Spears. Track 5 features Tom Angelripper.

Track listing
Damenwahl (Mambo Kurt)
I Was Made For Loving You (KISS)
Du trägst keine Liebe in Dir (Echt)
Highway To Hell (AC/DC)
Die Flut featuring Tom Angelripper (Witt/Heppner) 
You're My Heart You're My Soul (Modern Talking)
Rap Medley (WooHa-Busta Rhymes/The Message-Grandmaster Flash/Walk This Way-Aerosmith)
Join Me (In Death) (HIM)
Schnulzen Medley (Nothing Compares 2 U-Prince/Candle In The Wind (Original Version) -Elton John/My Heart Will Go On-Celine Dion)
Rockin' All Over The World (Status Quo)
Andreas Pils (Mambo Kurt)
Bloodhound Gang Medley (Fire Water Burn/Bad Touch/Along Comes Mary/Bad Touch reprise)
Metall Medley (Black no. 1 (Little Miss Scare-All) -Type O Negative/Mother-Danzig/Nothing Else Matters-Metallica)
Es geht voran (Fehlfarben)
Born To Make You Happy (Britney Spears)

Mambo Kurt albums
Covers albums
2002 albums